Minuscule 501 (in the Gregory-Aland numbering), 588 (in the Scrivener's numbering), ε 324 (in the Soden numbering), is a Greek minuscule manuscript of the New Testament, on parchment. Palaeographically it has been assigned to the 13th-century. 
The manuscript was adapted for liturgical use. It is lacunose.

Description 

The codex contains the text of the four Gospels on 157 parchment leaves (size ) with some lacunae (Luke 9:14-17:3; 21:15-24:53; John 1:1-18). Some texts were supplied by a later hand (Matthew 1:1-20; Mark 1:1-16; Luke 1:1-20; John 1:38-4:5).

The text is written in one column per page, 23 lines per page. There is also a division according to the smaller Ammonian Sections (in Mark 233 sections - the last in 16:19), (without references to the Eusebian Canons).

It lacks the Pericope Adulterae (John 7:53-8:11) and phrase  in John 7:8. The Pericope Adulterae was added by a later hand.

Text 

The Greek text of the codex is a representative of the Byzantine text-type. Hermann von Soden classified it as a member of the textual family Kx. Aland placed it in Category V.
According to the Claremont Profile Method it belongs to the textual family Kx in Luke 1 and Luke 20. In Luke 10 no profile was made.

History 

It is dated by the INTF to the 13th-century.

The manuscript came from Patmos. In 1834 Borrell presented it to his friend, English chaplain in Smyrna, F. V. J. Arundell. Bloomfield bought it in an auction in 1850.

Arundell compares it with Codex Ebnerianus, which it very slightly resembles, being larger and far less elegant.

The manuscript was added to the list of New Testament manuscripts by Scrivener (588) and C. R. Gregory (501). It was examined by Bloomfield, Scrivener, and Gregory (in 1883).

It is currently housed at the British Library (Add MS 18211) in London.

See also 

 List of New Testament minuscules
 Biblical manuscript
 Textual criticism

References

Further reading 

 F. V. J. Arundell, Discoveries in Asia Minor (London 1834), vol. II, p. 268.

Greek New Testament minuscules
13th-century biblical manuscripts
British Library additional manuscripts